Gondpipari is a town and a tehsil in Chandrapur subdivision of Chandrapur district in Nagpur division in the Vidarbha region in the state of Maharashtra, India.

References

Cities and towns in Chandrapur district
Talukas in Maharashtra